Astius (died AD 98AD) is a 2nd-century Christian martyr venerated by the Roman Catholic and Eastern Orthodox churches. He was the bishop of Dyrrhachium (now Durrës in Albania). According to legend, he was arrested by Agricola, the Roman governor of Dyrrachium, and was tortured to death around 98 AD for refusing to worship the god Dionysius. He was crucified during the persecution of Christians under the Roman emperor Trajan.

Life
The hieromartyr Astius was born an Illyrian. Astius was bishop of the city of Durrës (Dyrrachium), during the time of the emperor Trajan (98–117). The saint once had a dream, a foreboding of his impending suffering and death for Christ. He was arrested by the Roman governor of Durrës, Agricola, around the year 98. He was beaten with leaden rods and oxhide whips, but St Astius did not renounce Christ. They smeared his body with honey, so as to increase his suffering with the stings of hornets and flies, and crucified him for refusing to worship Dionysus. The martyr's body was reverently buried by Christians. His feast day is July 4. In Albania, he is commemorated on July 6.

During this period, many Christians fled to Albania to escape persecution in Italy. Among them were the seven holy martyrs: Peregrinus, Lucian, Pompeius, Hesychius, Papius, Saturninus and Germanus. Witnessing the martyrdom of Bishop Astius, who was crucified by the Romans, they openly praised the courage and firmness of the holy confessor. Because of this, they were seized, and as confessors of faith in Christ, they were arrested, thrown into chains, and subsequently drowned in the Adriatic Sea. Their bodies, carried to shore by the waves, were hidden in the sand by Christians. The martyrs appeared to the Bishop of Alexandria ninety years later, ordering him to bury their bodies and to build a church over them. Their feast day is 7 July.

St. Astius was declared patron protector of the city of Durrës.

References

External links
 Address Of The Holy Father John Paul II To a Group Of Albanian Pilgrims Gathered In Rome On Occasion Of The Marian Year,  6 May 1988

117 deaths
2nd-century Christian martyrs
2nd-century bishops in the Roman Empire
Illyrian people
People from Durrës
Year of birth unknown
Albanian saints